The Minimum Needs Programme (MNP) was introduced in the first year of the Fifth Five Year Plan(1974–78), to provide certain basic minimum needs and improve the living standards of people. It aims at "social and economic development of the community, particularly the underprivileged and underserved population". It also promoted equality as from now poor will be able to get basic needs.

Components
The programme includes the following components:
 Rural health
 Rural water supply
 Rural electrification
 Elementary education
 Adult education
 Nutrition
 Environmental improvement of urban slums
 Houses for landless labourers

Principles
Two basic principles are observed during the implementation of Minimum Needs Programme:
 the facilities under MNP are to be first provided in those areas which are at present underserved so as to remove disparities among different areas
 the facilities under MNP should be provided as a package to an area through intersectorial area projects to have a greater impact.

Objectives

Rural health
The objectives to be achieved by the end of the Eighth Five Year Plan are:
 One peripheral health centre for 30,000 population in plains and 20,000 population in tribal and hilly areas
 one sub-centre for a population of 5000 people in the plains and for 3000 in tribal and hilly areas
 one community health centre for a population of 100,000
The establishment of peripheral health centres, their up gradation also come under MNP.

Nutrition
 to extend support of nutrition to 11 million eligible persons
 to expand special nutrition programme to all ICDS projects
 to consolidate mid-day meal program and link it to health, potable water and sanitation.

References

Economic planning in India
Economic history of India (1947–present)
Rural development in India